Sojasun was a French cycling team registered at UCI Professional Continental level. They were founded in 2009 as Besson Chaussures-Sojasun. The team rode BH bicycles. Their sponsor Sojasun is a company which manufactures soya-based foods.

In 2012, the team received a wildcard invitation to the Tour de France, along with three other French-registered teams.

The professional cycling team Sojasun will not be present in the professional peloton in 2014, after the team was unable to find a new title sponsor.

Final team roster

Major wins

2009
 Stage 1 & 2 Étoile de Bessèges, Jimmy Casper
 Stage 2 3 Jours de Vaucluse, Jimmy Engoulvent
 Paris–Troyes, Yannick Talabardon
 Classic Loire Atlantique, Cyril Bessy
 Stage 1 Critérium International, Jimmy Casper
 Stage 3 Circuit de la Sarthe, Jimmy Engoulvent
 Paris–Camembert, Jimmy Casper
 Grand Prix de Denain, Jimmy Casper
 Stage 3 Tour de Bretagne, Laurent Mangel
 Stage 5 Tour de Bretagne, Jimmy Engoulvent
 Stage 2 Four Days of Dunkirk, Jimmy Engoulvent
 Grand Prix de Plumelec-Morbihan, Jérémie Galland
 Stage 2 Tour de Gironde, Jimmy Casper
 Stage 4 Tour de Gironde, Jimmy Engoulvent
 Stage 1 Ronde de l'Oise, Jimmy Casper
 Stage 3 Circuito Montañés, Jimmy Engoulvent
 Stage 1 Boucles de la Mayenne, Jimmy Casper
 Stage 4 Tour Alsace, Jimmy Engoulvent
 Stage 2 Tour du Poitou-Charentes, Jimmy Casper
 Châteauroux Classic, Jimmy Casper
 Stage 2 Tour du Gévaudan, Laurent Mangel
2010
 GP d'Ouverture, Jonathan Hivert
 Stage 1 Tour of Oman, Jimmy Casper
 Classic Loire Atlantique, Laurent Mangel
 Stage 4 Tour de Normandie, Jimmy Casper
 Overall Rhône-Alpes Isère Tour, Jérôme Coppel
Stage 1, Jérôme Coppel
 Stage 3 Tour de Picardie, Jimmy Casper
 Stage 3 Tour of Belgium, Jimmy Casper
 Prologue Tour de Luxembourg, Jimmy Engoulvent
 Val d'Ille U Classic 35, Jimmy Casper
 Overall Boucles de la Mayenne, Jérémie Galland
Prologue, Jimmy Engoulvent
Stage 1, Laurent Mangel
 Stage 4 Tour de Wallonie, Laurent Mangel
 Stage 1 Tour Alsace, Cyril Bessy
 Prologue Volta a Portugal, Jimmy Engoulvent
 Stage 3 Volta a Portugal, Jimmy Casper
 Stage 1 Tour de l'Ain, Stéphane Poulhiès
 Stage 1 Tour du Limousin, Jérémie Galland
 Overall Tour du Poitou-Charentes, Jimmy Engoulvent
Stage 3, Jimmy Engoulvent
Stage 5, Jimmy Casper
 Tour du Doubs, Jérôme Coppel
 Overall Tour du Gévaudan, Jérôme Coppel
Stage 1, Guillaume Levarlet
Stage 2, Jérôme Coppel
2012
 Overall Étoile de Bessèges, Jérôme Coppel
Stage 5a, Stéphane Poulhies
Stage 5b, Jérôme Coppel
 Stages 5 & 7 Volta a Catalunya, Julien Simon
 Tour du Finistère, Julien Simon
 Stage 2 Tour de Romandie, Jonathan Hivert
 Overall Four Days of Dunkirk, Jimmy Engoulvent
Stage 3, Jimmy Engoulvent
 Overall Rhône-Alpes Isère Tour, Paul Poux
Stage 1, Paul Poux
 Grand Prix de Plumelec-Morbihan, Julien Simon
 Prologue Tour de Luxembourg, Jimmy Engoulvent
 Stage 1 Route du Sud, Stéphane Poulhies
 Prologue Boucles de la Mayenne, Paul Poux
 Tour du Doubs, Jérôme Coppel
 Grand Prix de Wallonie, Julien Simon
2013
 Overall Étoile de Bessèges, Jonathan Hivert
 Stages 1 & 2 Vuelta a Andalucía, Jonathan Hivert
 Prologue Tour de Luxembourg, Jimmy Engoulvent
 Stage 6 Volta a Portugal, Maxime Daniel

References

External links

Defunct cycling teams based in France
Cycling teams established in 2009
Cycling teams disestablished in 2013
Former UCI Professional Continental teams